John Lane Freer (born 1803 at Hereford; died 1834 in England) was an English cricketer with amateur status. He was associated with Cambridge University and made his first-class debut in 1827.

Freer was educated at Westminster School and Trinity College, Cambridge. He became a Church of England priest and was vicar of Wasperton 1829–32 and of Perry Barr from 1832 until his death.

References

Bibliography
 

1803 births
1832 deaths
English cricketers
English cricketers of 1826 to 1863
Cambridge University cricketers
People educated at Westminster School, London
Alumni of Trinity College, Cambridge
19th-century English Anglican priests